This is a list of military installations in Myanmar operated by the Myanmar Armed Forces.

Joint 

 Fort Ba Htoo
 Fort Bayinnaung
 Fort Ye Mon

Air Force 

 Hmawbi Air Base
 Kyaukhtu Air Base
 Lashio Air Base
 Magway Air Base
 Mingaladon Air Base
 Monywa Air Base
 Myeik Air Base
 Nampong Air Force Base
 Namsang Air Base
 Naypyidaw Air Base
 Pathein Air Base
 Shante Air Base
 Tada-U Air Base
 Taungoo Air Base

Academic 

 Defence Services Academy (DSA)
 Defence Services Medical Academy (DSMA)
 Defence Services Technological Academy (DSTA)
 Defence Services Institute of Nursing and Paramedical Science

Training Schools

 Officers Training School, Bahtoo (OTS)
 Basic Army Combat Training School, Bahtoo
 1st Army Combat Forces School, Bahtoo
 2nd Army Combat Forces School, Bayinnaung
 Special Forces School, Ye Mon
 Artillery Training School, Mone Tai
 Armour Training School, Maing Maw
 Electronic Warfare School, Pyin U Lwin
 Engineer School, Pyin U Lwin
 Information Warfare School, Yangon
 Air, Land and Paratroops Training School, Hmawbi

Navy 

 Irrawaddy Regional Command (headquarters in Yangon)
 Thanhklyet Soon Naval Base
 Thanlyin Naval Base
 Thanlyin Naval Base
 Thilawa Naval Base
 Coco Island Base (including Naval Radar Unit)
 Danyawaddy Regional Command (headquarters in Sittwe)
 Kyaukpyu Naval Base
 Thandwe (Sandoway) Naval Base
 No. 71 Submarine Base (on Ownchein Island near Kyaukphyu SEZ)
 Panmawaddy Regional Command (headquarters on Haigyi Island)
 Mawyawaddy Regional Command (headquarters in Mawlamyine)
 Tanintharyi Regional Command (headquarters in Myeik)
 Zadetkyi Island Naval Base
 Mali (Tavoy) Naval Base
 Palai Island Naval Base
 Kadan Naval Base
 Sakanthit Naval Base
 Lambi Naval Base
 Pearl Island Naval Base
 Zadetkale Naval Base

See also 

 Lists of military installations
 Tatmadaw

References 

 
Myanmar
Installations
Military